Dudley Ryder, 6th Earl of Harrowby (11 October 1892 – 7 May 1987), known as Viscount Sandon from 1900 to 1956, was a British peer and Conservative Member of Parliament.

Harrowby was the son of John Ryder, 5th Earl of Harrowby, and the Hon. Mabel Danvers Smith. William Henry Smith, another former Member of Parliament, was his maternal grandfather. He was educated at Eton College and Christ Church, Oxford, graduating as B.A. He was made an honorary D.Litt. by the university in 1964.

Harrowby was a Territorial officer in the Royal Field Artillery and served through World War I, during which he was wounded, rising to Major. He was re-employed in World War II as a Major with the Royal Artillery. From 1946 to 1950 he was Colonel Commandant of Staffordshire Army Cadet Force.

His first working contact with politics was as Assistant Private Secretary to Secretary of State for the Colonies, Viscount Milner from 1919 to 1920. He was elected to the House of Commons for Shrewsbury in 1922, a seat he held until 1923 and again from 1924 to 1929, and was Parliamentary Private Secretary to the Secretary of State for Air Sir Samuel Hoare between 1922 and 1923. Harrowby was also a member of the Commission on Historical Manuscripts from 1935 to 1966 and was the author of Geography of Everyday Things and (jointly) England at Worship. In 1956 he succeeded his father in the earldom and entered the House of Lords.

He served in local government as an Alderman of London County Council from 1932 to 1937, then as an elected County Councillor from 1937 to 1940. He also became a D.L. for Staffordshire in 1925 and J.P. for the same county in 1929.

Lord Harrowby married Lady Helena Blanche Coventry, daughter of George William Coventry, Viscount Deerhurst, in 1922. She died in 1974. Harrowby survived her by thirteen years and died in May 1987, aged 94.

He was succeeded in his titles by his eldest son Dudley.

References 
Kidd, Charles, Williamson, David (editors). Debrett's Peerage and Baronetage (1990 edition). New York: St Martin's Press, 1990.

External links 
 

1892 births
1987 deaths
People educated at Eton College
Ryder, Dudley
Earls of Harrowby
Ryder, Dudley
Ryder, Dudley
Harrowby, E6
Ryder, Dudley
Dudley